Harleston Town Football Club is a football club based in Harleston, Norfolk, England.

History
The club was established in 1885. They became members of the top division of the East Anglian League in 1952. In 1963–64 the club won the league's Knockout Cup, beating Norman Old Boys in the final. At the end of the season the league merged with the Norfolk & Suffolk League to form the Anglian Combination, with Harleston placed in Section A. However, they were subsequently relegated several divisions.

In 1980–81 Harleston were Division Three champions. They went on to win Division Two the following season, earning promotion to Division One. Following two relegations, in 2005–06 the club finished bottom of Division Three and were relegated to Division Four. A third-place finish in Division Four in 2008–09 saw them promoted back to Division Three. The club were champions of Division Three again in 2010–11 before winning the Division Two title in 2011–12.

After finishing as runners-up in Division One in 2013–14, Harleston were promoted to the Premier Division. They were Premier Division runners-up in 2016–17 and won the division the following season, earning promotion to Division One North of the Eastern Counties League. Despite finishing as runners-up in Division One North in 2018–19, the club were relegated back to the Anglian Combination Premier Division as their ground failed the grading criteria by not having floodlights. However, at the end of the 2020–21 season they were promoted back into Division One North of the Eastern Counties League.

Honours
Anglian Combination
Premier Division champions 2017–18
Division Two champions 1981–82, 2011–12
Division Three champions 1980–81, 2010–11
East Anglian League
Knockout Cup winners 1963–64

References

External links
Official website

Football clubs in England
Football clubs in Norfolk
1885 establishments in England
Association football clubs established in 1885
Harleston, Norfolk
East Anglian League
Anglian Combination
Eastern Counties Football League